Cartas sin destino (English: Letters without destiny) is a Mexican telenovela produced by Ernesto Alonso for Televisión Independiente de México in 1973.

Plot 
Rosina and Procopia (known as "Propia") are two young sisters who have grown up in an orphanage, but the day comes that they should go out and meet the real world. They move to the capital where they get accommodation in a neighborhood. As Rosina has a talent for sewing, decides to put a sewing business at home.

Cast 
Jacqueline Andere as Rosina
Claudia Islas as Propia (Procopia)
José Alonso as Fabian
Ernesto Alonso as Marcelo
Anita Blanch as Doña Prizca
Enrique Lizalde as Javier
Lucía Méndez
Héctor Bonilla
Raquel Olmedo

References

External links 

Mexican telenovelas
1973 telenovelas
Televisa telenovelas
Spanish-language telenovelas
1973 Mexican television series debuts
1973 Mexican television series endings